This is the discography documenting albums and singles released by American R&B/soul singer Natalie Cole.

Albums

Studio albums

Live albums

Compilation albums

Singles

Other appearances

Notes

References

Rhythm and blues discographies
Discographies of American artists
Soul music discographies